Isaiah is the main figure in the biblical Book of Isaiah.

Isaiah may also refer to: 

Isaiah (given name), including lists of people and fictional characters with this name
Isaiah, pen name of Chinese science fiction writer Baoshu
Isaiah, a figure in the Book of Mormon
Isaiah, California, a ghost town
VIA Nano, formerly codenamed VIA Isaiah, a 64 bit computer processor from VIA Technologies
Isaiah (album)
"Isiah", a song by Reks from Grey Hairs

See also
 Hurricane Isaias, a 2020 hurricane